Monkstown Church is a church of the Church of Ireland located in Monkstown, County Dublin, Ireland.

History
The first works for the original church were commenced in 1785, and it was opened in 1789, as a very simple church. In 1825 it was decided to rebuild the church and the architect John Semple of the Board of First Fruits was engaged. The new church was completed in the 1830s.

In 1868, the church was extended by John McCurdy, with the addition of a chancel to the same style as the original design of John Semple.

In 2007, conservation work began on the church, with assistance from the Irish Georgian Society.

The church contains a memorial to members of the parish killed or missing during the Crimean War and the Great War.

Rectors
Rev. Dr. William FitzGerald served in Monkstown, from 1855 to 1857 when he was elevated to Bishop of Cork, he was succeeded by the Rev. Dr. Ronald MacDonnell who served from 1857 to 1878. Archbishop of Dublin Joseph Peacocke served as rector of Monkstown 1878–94; he had earlier been a curate in the parish from 1863 to 1873. Rev. Canon J. C. Dowse, succeeded Bishop Peacocke as Rector in 1894.

Rev. Kevin Dalton served as rector from 1979 until 2007, he was succeeded by Venerable Patrick Lawrence. The incumbent rector Rev. Canon Roy Byrne is rector since 2016.

Gallery

References

External links 
Official Website

Monkstown, Dublin
Churches in Dún Laoghaire–Rathdown
Church of Ireland church buildings in the Republic of Ireland